Nichols is an unincorporated community in Polk County, Florida, United States, located  south-southwest of Lakeland. Nichols has a post office with ZIP code 33863. The community is located on a CSX Rail spur on Polk County Road 676, less than one mile south of Florida State Road 60.

See also

References

External links

Unincorporated communities in Polk County, Florida
Unincorporated communities in Florida